Finestkind is an upcoming American crime thriller drama film written and directed by Brian Helgeland and starring Tommy Lee Jones, Ben Foster, Toby Wallace, Jenna Ortega, Tim Daly, Clayne Crawford and Aaron Stanford.

Premise
Two estranged brothers hatch a deal with a Boston crime syndicate, which spells danger for the brothers and their father as well as a mysterious young woman.

Cast
Tommy Lee Jones
Ben Foster as Tom
Toby Wallace as Charlie
Jenna Ortega as Nicky
Tim Daly as Dennis Sykes
Clayne Crawford as Pete Weeks
Aaron Stanford as Skeemo
Scotty Tovar as Nunes
Lolita Davidovich as Donna Sykes
Meghan Leathers
Ismael Cruz Córdova as Costa
Fernanda Andrade as Anne Marie
Charlie Thurston as Mr. White
Kevin Craig West as Jail Van Driver

Production
In 2018, Jake Gyllenhaal, Ansel Elgort and Zendaya were attached to star in the film.

In April 2022, it was announced that Paramount+ acquired the rights to the film.

Filming began in Massachusetts in April 2022.  That same month, it was announced that Tim Daly, Clayne Crawford, Aaron Stanford, Scotty Tovar and Lolita Davidovich have been added to the cast.  Meghan Leathers also joined the cast in April 2022.

Filming wrapped in May 2022.

References

External links
 

Upcoming films
Films shot in Massachusetts
Films directed by Brian Helgeland
Films scored by Carter Burwell
Films with screenplays by Brian Helgeland
Paramount+ original films
American crime thriller films
American crime drama films
Works by Taylor Sheridan